Real Madrid Femenino is a Spanish women's football club in Madrid. Founded as the independent Club Deportivo TACÓN in 2014, the club later underwent a merger and acquisition process with Real Madrid beginning in 2019 and was officially rebranded as Real Madrid's women's football section in 2020.

The club currently plays in the Primera División.

History

2014–2019: Club Deportivo TACÓN

CD TACÓN was founded on 12 September 2014 and began playing at senior level in 2016. The name TACÓN (Heel) is an acronym of Trabajo (work) Atrevimiento (dare/bravery) Conocimiento (knowledge) Organización (organisation) Notoriedad (visibility/renown). In their first competitive season, 2015–16, the club only registered an under-14 team. In June 2016, TACÓN announced a merger with CD Canillas for incorporating their women's senior and under-19 teams.

In their first season at senior level, in the 2016–17 Segunda División, TACÓN finished second in their regional group, below Madrid CFF, who won promotion to the Primera División.

Because both Madrid CFF and TACÓN were clubs open to a potential takeover by Real Madrid, a rivalry developed between them. Madrid CFF was founded in 2010 by businessman Alfredo Ulloa, a Real Madrid socio (member) like TACÓN's founder, Ana Rossell. She described the clubs' relations as "cordial" in 2019.

Rossell had petitioned successive Real Madrid presidents, Lorenzo Sanz, Florentino Pérez and Ramón Calderón, to create a women's football section since 1997, but received no official response. According to Rossell, her requests were denied, with club executives citing that a women's section wasn't economically sustainable. In those years, she was a player for Atlético Feminas and CD Canillas. In 2016, Rossell called publicly for Real Madrid to create a women's football section.

In June 2017 Real Madrid's president, Florentino Pérez, claimed that the club would make its own women's team from scratch, and not buy an existing club. Rossell had claimed in 2013 that Pérez was first starting to consider women's football at the club. Real was thus doing so several years or decades later than many other clubs in Europe and in the city of Madrid itself.

On El Larguero in 2017, Pérez said “We will definitely have a women’s team,” he said. “We’re working on it, but it will be from the position of a newly formed club, not a team in which we bring the best player from Germany, Brazil… That is not what Madridismo is all about.”

As late as September 2018, Pérez still ruled out having a women's team, as El Confidencial reported: "Florentino did not want to spend on a section that did not guarantee trophies and his agents lied to him about the expenses necessary for him to create it". Women's football was not mentioned at all by Pérez at the club's annual assembly on 23 September 2018, and Oscar Sanz of El País wrote, "Real Madrid has the dubious honor of being, together with Getafe, the only First Division club that has neither had nor has a women's team."

2019: Takeover by Real Madrid

After three seasons in the Segunda División, on 19 May 2019, TACÓN achieved promotion to the Primera División.

On 25 June 2019, the Real Madrid CF board of directors announced a proposal of integrating TACÓN as their women's football section to be presented to their socios (members). As part of the agreement, TACÓN would play their 2019–20 season matches at Ciudad Real Madrid during the transition, with the merger being officially completed on 1 July 2020. On 15 September 2019, The Extraordinary General Assembly of Real Madrid approved the absorption of the club. Florentino Perez, speaking at the General Assembly after the vote to absorb was passed, cited that TACÓN's youth system was the reason why it was chosen as the base for the women's team, thus striving to stay true to Real Madrid's philosophy of developing Spanish talent.

2019–2020: Transition year
Having been promoted, the club went on to lose a large majority of its playing squad in the summer of 2019. Argentine midfielder Ruth Bravo moved to Rayo Vallecano, while others like Lixy, Marbel Okoye and Yamilla Badell did not have their contracts renewed. In order to strengthen for the coming season, the club saw the arrival of Swedish duo Kosovare Asllani and Sofia Jakobsson; French midfielder Aurélie Kaci from Atlético Madrid, Ainoa Campo from Madrid CFF, English forward Chioma Ubogagu, goalkeeper Ana Valles, Nigerian defender Osinachi Ohale, as well as the Brazilian pair Daiane and Thaisa Moreno, who was nominated for best midfielder in her lone year at A.C. Milan Women. The last signing of the summer was versatile defender Babett Peter from VFL Wolfsburg.

Despite the wealth of talent and experience at their disposal, CD TACÓN's start to the season was nothing short of abysmal, with a heavy loss against Barcelona (9–1) in its debut match, and EDF Logroño particularly standing out. After a poor run with just one win in nine games, the team started to gain a sense of stability in November 2019, going on a five match unbeaten run. TACÓN finished the shortened 2019–20 season in 10th place, with many fans unhappy with how the team had thrown away a 3–0 lead with ten minutes to go and ended up losing 4–3 on home soil in the last match before the outbreak of the COVID-19 pandemic.

Real Madrid Women were also the subject of a documentary series in 2020.

2020–present: Real Madrid Femenino
On 1 July 2020, Real Madrid CF released an official communication confirming the completion of the merger, thereby signalling the complete absorption of CD TACÓN, which would then operate as 'Real Madrid' from that date onwards.

The new structure of the section includes a senior team, reserve side similar to Castilla, known as 'Real Madrid Femenino B', an Under-19 team, 'Juvenil' and a 'Cadete' for under-15s and below. The structure already existed under CD TACÓN and has been integrated into Real Madrid's famous La Fábrica. The remaining TACÓN Juvenil and Cadete teams that couldn't be absorbed right away have since been rebranded as 'Fenix Football Club', which in turn merged with CD Masriver in 2021.

Home ground
During the transition season, TACÓN played their home fixtures at Field 11 in Ciudad Real Madrid. The matches were not open to the general public, with only club members, selected away fans and those possessing a membership card, allowed to attend. Following the completion of the merger, and given that the senior men's team was using the Estadio Alfredo di Stéfano, Real Madrid Femenino continued to play their home matches at Field 11. At the start of the 2021–22 season, the women's team have alternated between Field 11 and the Alfredo di Stéfano stadium, initially with a reduced capacity for fan attendance.

Season to season

As CD TACÓN

As Real Madrid Femenino

Personnel

Current technical staff

Record in UEFA Women's Champions League
All results (home, away and aggregate) list Real Madrid's goal tally first.

Current squad
As of 24 February 2023

Head coaches

CD TACÓN
Marta Tejedor (2016–2018)
David Aznar (2018–2020)

Real Madrid
David Aznar (2020–2021)
Alberto Toril (2021–present)

References

External links
Official website 

Femenino
Women's football clubs in Spain
Football clubs in Madrid
2014 establishments in Spain
Association football clubs established in 2014
Primera División (women) clubs